Sugar Island Township is a civil township of Chippewa County in the U.S. state of Michigan. The population was 652 at the 2010 census. The township consists entirely of Sugar Island in the St. Marys River, and the waters directly around the island.

Some of its land is within the reservation of the Bay Mills Indian Community, a federally recognized tribe and band of Chippewa who have long been in the region of Sault Ste. Marie, Michigan. Native Americans make up one-third of the population on the island.

History
The Ojibwe (known as Chippewa in the United States) occupied the island and nearby areas for at least 500 years. Among the federally recognized tribes in Michigan is the Bay Mills Indian Community, which has territory on Sugar Island.

Communities 
 Homestead is an unincorporated community on the southeastern end of the island at

Geography
The township is located directly east of the city of Sault Ste. Marie, Michigan, and is connected to the city by a ferry. Sault Ste. Marie, Ontario, is to the northwest across the St. Marys River, but with no direct transportation connection.  Sugar Island Township is one of only seven municipalities in the state of Michigan to consist entirely of islands, including Grosse Ile Township, Drummond Township, Bois Blanc Township, Mackinac Island, Peaine Township, and St. James Township.

Demographics
As of the census of 2000, there were 683 people, 294 households, and 211 families residing in the township.  The population density was 13.8 per square mile (5.3/km).  There were 652 housing units at an average density of 13.2 per square mile (5.1/km).  The racial makeup of the township was 63.54% White, 30.01% Native American, 0.29% from other races, and 6.15% from two or more races. Hispanic or Latino of any race were 0.44% of the population.

There were 294 households, out of which 24.1% had children under the age of 18 living with them, 62.6% were married couples living together, 6.5% had a female householder with no husband present, and 27.9% were non-families. 23.8% of all households were made up of individuals, and 8.5% had someone living alone who was 65 years of age or older.  The average household size was 2.32 and the average family size was 2.75.

In the township the population was spread out, with 20.1% under the age of 18, 5.7% from 18 to 24, 23.6% from 25 to 44, 32.8% from 45 to 64, and 17.9% who were 65 years of age or older.  The median age was 45 years. For every 100 females, there were 110.2 males.  For every 100 females age 18 and over, there were 103.0 males.

The median income for a household in the township was $34,000, and the median income for a family was $38,846. Males had a median income of $32,500 versus $25,000 for females. The per capita income for the township was $16,076.  About 7.3% of families and 10.9% of the population were below the poverty line, including 11.3% of those under age 18 and 10.6% of those age 65 or over.

References

External links
Sugar Island Township official website

Townships in Chippewa County, Michigan
Townships in Michigan